Harold Gerard Mosier (July 24, 1889 – August 7, 1971) was an American lawyer and politician who served as a U.S. Representative from Ohio for one term from 1937 to 1939. He was also the 45th lieutenant governor of Ohio from 1935 to 1937.

Early life and career 
Mosier was born in Cincinnati, Ohio. He attended East High School in Cleveland, Ohio. He was graduated from Dartmouth College, Hanover, New Hampshire, in 1912 and from the law department of Harvard University in 1915. He was admitted to the bar in 1916 and commenced practice in Cleveland.

Mosier married Grace Hoyt Jones of Columbus, Ohio, April 20, 1918.

Political career 
He served as a member of the Ohio Senate 1933-1935 and was the lieutenant governor of Ohio 1935-1937.

Congress 
Mosier was elected as a Democrat to the Seventy-fifth Congress (January 3, 1937 – January 3, 1939). He sat on the Dies Committee.
He was an unsuccessful candidate for renomination in 1938. He resumed the practice of law in Cleveland, Baltimore, and Washington, D.C. He was Counsel to Glenn L. Martin Co. and the Aircraft Industries Association. He retired in 1961.

Death
He resided in Washington, D.C., until his death there on August 7, 1971. He was interred in Fort Lincoln Cemetery.

See also
 List of members of the House Un-American Activities Committee

Sources

Lieutenant Governors of Ohio
1889 births
1971 deaths
Dartmouth College alumni
Harvard Law School alumni
Politicians from Cincinnati
Politicians from Cleveland
Ohio lawyers
Democratic Party Ohio state senators
20th-century American politicians
Lawyers from Cleveland
20th-century American lawyers
Democratic Party members of the United States House of Representatives from Ohio